Ctenosaura oedirhina, commonly known as the Roatán spiny-tailed iguana or de Queiroz's spiny-tailed iguana, is a species of lizard in the family Iguanidae.
It is endemic to Honduras, on the island of Roatán in the Caribbean, to which one of its common names refers. The Roatán iguana is a medium sized iguana with a rounded snout, short crest scales, and a snout-vent length ranging from 151 to 325mm.

Habitat
Its natural habitat is subtropical or tropical dry forests.

Conservation status
It is currently listed an endangered species under the International Union for Conservation of Nature (IUCN). It is threatened by habitat loss.

References

Further reading
 de Queiroz, Kevin. 1987. A New Spiny-tailed Iguana from Honduras, with Comments on Relationships within Ctenosaura (Squamata: Iguania). Copeia 1987 (4): 892–902.

Lizards of the Caribbean
Reptiles of Honduras
Ctenosaura
Endemic fauna of Honduras
Roatán
Reptiles described in 1987
Taxa named by Kevin de Queiroz
Taxonomy articles created by Polbot